Euonymus alatus, known variously as winged spindle, winged euonymus, or burning bush, is a species of flowering plant in the family Celastraceae, native to central and northern China, Japan, and Korea.

The common name "burning bush" comes from the bright red fall color.

It is a popular ornamental plant in gardens and parks due to its bright pink or orange fruit and attractive fall color. The cultivar 'Compactus' has gained the Royal Horticultural Society's Award of Garden Merit.

Description

As with the related Euonymus phellomanus, the stems are notable for their four corky ridges or "wings." The word alatus (or alata, used formerly) is Latin for "winged," in reference to the winged branches. These structures develop from a cork cambium deposited in longitudinal grooves in the twigs' first year, unlike similar wings in other plants. The flowers are greenish, borne over a long period in the spring. The fruit is a red aril enclosed by a four-lobed pink, yellow, or orange capsule

All parts of the plant are toxic by ingestion, causing severe discomfort.

Taxonomy
Euonymus alatus is native to northeastern Asia and China. In the United States, it was first introduced in the 1860s.

Common names: burning bush, wing burning bush, winged euonymus, and winged spindle-tree.

Distribution and Habitat
Its native distribution extends from northeastern Asia to central China. Besides central and eastern China, Euonymus alatus also appears in Korea, Japan, and the island of Sakhalin in Russia. In its native areas, it occurs in forests, woodlands, and scrublands from sea level to  elevation.

Euonymus alatus is not native to North America. In the United States, it is found in New England, as well as Illinois, extending south to northern Florida and the Gulf Coast. It is currently considered an invasive species in 21 states.

Uses
Generally cultivated for its ornamental qualities, attraction to wildlife, and ability to adapt to urban and suburban environments. The shrub is commonly used in foundation planting, hedges, and along highways and commercial strips. Sales nationally are in the tens of millions of dollars every year.

The corky winged stems are utilized in traditional Chinese and Korean medicine. It is used to treat conditions such as cancer, hyperglycemia, and diabetic complications. Chemicals that have been isolated from this plant include flavonoids, terpenoids, steroids, lignans, cardenolides, phenolic acids, and alkaloids.

Invasive species
This plant is regarded as an invasive species of woodlands in eastern North America, and its importation and sale is prohibited in the states of Massachusetts, New Hampshire, Maine, Pennsylvania, and Vermont.

References

Further reading

alatus
Flora of Japan
Flora of China
Flora of Korea
Garden plants